The Memramcook River is a river located in Westmorland County, in southeastern New Brunswick, eastern Canada.

Geography

See also
Memramcook, New Brunswick
Petitcodiac Riverkeeper
Shepody Bay
Bay of Fundy

References

Rivers of New Brunswick
Landforms of Westmorland County, New Brunswick